Petr Trapp (born 6 December 1985) is a Czech football player who most recently played for 1. FK Příbram. He made his international début for the Czech Republic against Peru in June 2011.

References

External links 
 
 
 
 

1985 births
Living people
Czech footballers
Czech Republic under-21 international footballers
Czech Republic international footballers
Czech First League players
Super League Greece players
SK Slavia Prague players
FK Chmel Blšany players
FC Viktoria Plzeň players
1. FK Příbram players
Veria F.C. players
Expatriate footballers in Greece
Salam Zgharta FC players
Expatriate footballers in Lebanon
Flamurtari Vlorë players
Expatriate footballers in Albania
FC Nitra players
Expatriate footballers in Slovakia
Sportspeople from Most (city)
Association football midfielders
Association football defenders
Czech expatriate footballers
Czech expatriate sportspeople in Lebanon
Lebanese Premier League players